Fylax (meaning "keeper") is a genus of hadrosauroid ornithopod from the Late Cretaceous Figuerola Formation of Spain. The genus contains a single species, Fylax thyrakolasus, known from a nearly complete left dentary.

Discovery and naming 
The holotype of Fylax, IPS-36338, a left dentary, was discovered in the early 1990s. It was found in the Figuerola Formation in Lleida province, northeastern Spain. It was initially described in 1999.

In 2021, Albert Prieto-Márquez and Miguel Ángel Carrera Farias described the dentary as belonging to a new genus of hadrosauroid dinosaur. The generic name, Fylax, comes from the modern Greek, fýlax (keeper), and the specific name, thyrakolasus, comes from the Greek thýra (gate) and kólasi (hell), thus creating the combination "keeper of the gates of hell” in reference to the proximity of this taxon to the Cretaceous-Paleogene mass extinction event.

Classification 
Prieto-Márquez and Carrera Farias recover Fylax as the sister taxon to Tethyshadros, in a derived position in the Hadrosauromorpha, making it one of the latest surviving non-hadrosaurid hadrosauromorphs. Their cladogram is shown below:

References 

Hadrosaurs
Fossils of Spain
Cretaceous Spain
Fossil taxa described in 2021
Ornithischian genera